Frieda Lauth (1879 London – 4 May 1949 Durban) was a South African botanical artist who emigrated to Natal with her parents in 1882. She worked as an assistant at the Natal Herbarium and is noted for her illustrations of Medley Wood's Natal Plants. She resigned in 1903 upon marrying Thomas Floyd, and later lectured in botany at the Durban Technical College.

References

1879 births
1949 deaths
20th-century South African painters
Botanical illustrators
British emigrants to the Colony of Natal